This is a list of diplomatic missions in Mauritius.  At present, the capital city of Port Louis hosts 15 embassies/high commissions.  Several other countries have missions accredited from other capitals, mostly in Pretoria, Harare, Antananarivo and London.

Embassies/High Commissions In Port Louis

Other missions in Port Louis
 (Delegation)

Non-Resident Embassies/High Commissions

Resident in Antananarivo, Madagascar

Resident in Dar es Salaam, Tanzania

Resident in Harare, Zimbabwe

Resident in Maputo, Mozambique

Resident in Nairobi, Kenya

Resident in Pretoria, South Africa

Resident in New Delhi

Other places 

 (London)
 (London)  
 (Addis Ababa)  
 (Moroni)
 (Colombo) 
 (Valletta)  
 (Suva)
 (New York City)
 (Suva)
 (Managua)
 (Mbabane)  
 (London)
 (New York City)
 (London)
 (Singapore)  
 (Luanda)
 (London)
 (Victoria) 
 (Islamabad)  
 (Canberra)  
 (Addis Ababa)

Former Embassies

See also
 Foreign relations of Mauritius
 List of diplomatic missions of Mauritius

References

External links
Diplomatic list

Diplomatic missions
Mauritius
Diplomatic missions